Young Black Brotha is Californian rapper Mac Dre's debut release. It was issued in 1989 on vinyl and cassette. Tracks 1 and 3 would later appear on the compilation of the same name in 1993.

Track list 

As well as the four songs listed above, the LP jackets and cassette J-cards also mentioned a radio edit of "Mac Dre's the Name" at the end of side G and the instrumental track for "Young Black Brotha" at the end of side Q, although they were not present on the LP or MC.

When tracks 1 and 3 were included on the Young Black Brotha album in 1993, track 1 was shortened by 15 seconds and track 3 was retitled to "2 Hard 4 the Fuckin' Radio".

A completely different track named "Mac Dre's the Name" was used as the title track for the album of the same name in 2001.

References

External links 
 Young Black Brotha at Discogs (list of versions)

1989 debut EPs
Mac Dre albums
Gangsta rap EPs